ExxonMobil has offshore oil production in Nigeria, and is the country's second largest crude oil producer. Mobil Producing Nigeria (MPN) began shallow water operations in 1955, and owns over 90 platforms and 300 producing wells covering .

ExxonMobil also has deepwater production in Nigeria. Esso Exploration and Production Nigeria Limited (EEPNL) operates interests in the Erha, Usan, and Bonga developments.

ExxonMobil partners with the Nigerian National Petroleum Corporation (now NNPC Limited). The company operates in Akwa Ibom State, Nigeria.

ExxonMobil was working toward an agreement to sell all of its shallow water assets (MPN) to Seplat in August, 2022 for $1.3 billion to $1.6 billion, pending regulatory hurdles.

References

External links

 'Our activities in Nigeria' on ExxonMobil website
 Mobil Producing Nigeria at Alacrastore

ExxonMobil subsidiaries
Oil and gas companies of Nigeria
Energy companies established in 1955
Nigerian subsidiaries of foreign companies